Einar Steensnæs (born 10 March 1942) is a Norwegian politician for the Christian Democrats, and served as parliamentary representative for Rogaland 1993–1997. He was also Minister of Education and Church Affairs 1989–1990, and Minister of Petroleum and Energy 2001–2004.

References

1942 births
Living people
Government ministers of Norway
Petroleum and energy ministers of Norway
Members of the Storting
Christian Democratic Party (Norway) politicians
21st-century Norwegian politicians
20th-century Norwegian politicians
Ministers of Education of Norway